The AXE telephone exchange is a product line of circuit switched digital telephone exchanges  manufactured by Ericsson, a Swedish telecom company. It was developed in 1974 by Ellemtel, a research and development subsidiary of Ericsson and Televerket. The first system was deployed in 1976. AXE is not an acronym, but an Ericsson product code.

The AXE is the digital successor to the AKE analogue telephone exchange and ARF/ARM family of crossbar switches. The design is modular with an APZ dual processor running in sync mode, an APT switching part and an APG I/O part. It is used for connecting local landlines, operating mobile networks (TDMA, GSM, CDMA, W-CDMA, PDC), international telephony traffic and signaling.

AXE based equipment are being used as BSC/TRC, MSC, HLR, SCP, FNR, TSC, STP and wireline nodes.

The brain of the AXE system is a dual processor system called APZ. It runs in parallel sync mode making it fault redundant. The family of APZs started with APZ 210 03 in 1976; the latest one is APZ 214 03. The parallel sync mode was partly abandoned in the APZ 212 40 and subsequent models and has been replaced with a warm standby scheme.

The latest APZ type is 214 03 which is used as MSC, TSC and HLR Blade in AXE. The latest implementation of AXE is on a blade cluster system capable of handling up to 8 million subscribers.

The core of the switching part was the Group Switch, initially a time-space-time multiplexer capable of switching up to 64K positions or connections. This Group Switch later evolved to a Distributed Group Switch using Time-Space switching technique with a maximum capacity of 512K.

AXE nodes have evolved as a traffic controller, having the new Media Gateway node running on CPP platform handle the payload traffic.

Ericsson AXE telephone exchanges support lawful intercepts via the remote-control equipment subsystem (RES), which carries out the tap, and the interception management system (IMS), software used for initiating the tap, which adds the tap to the RES database. In a fully operating lawful interception system the RES and IMS both create logs of all numbers being tapped so that system administrators can perform audits to find unauthorized taps.

Code is written in PLEX (a proprietary programming language tied to the AXE hardware, designed by Göran Hemdahl), SDL and ASA210C programming languages. Code for Regional Processors (controlling hardware Extension Modules) is written in ASA210R.

AXE switches used in the United Kingdom are sometimes referred to as System Y as they were the first competitive alternative to the domestically developed System X digital switching system.

See also
Greek telephone tapping case 2004-2005

References

External links
Ericsson AXE web page

Telephone exchange equipment
Ericsson